Adoor Palam is a village near Kadachira, in Kannur District, India.

Thalassery road, Kannur